The Hōshin Line (Hōshin-sen) was a railway line in Karafuto Prefecture during the days of the Empire of Japan. It ran  from Toyohara Station in what was then the city of Toyohara, to Tei Station in what was then the town of Maoka.

Route
As published by the Ministry of Railways, as of 1 October 1937 the stations of the Hōshin Line were as follows:

Line was fully operated by Soviet Railways until 1994, when middle mountain section was abandoned due to technical conditions of tunnels. 

East section Yuzno-Sakhalinsk - Novoderevenskaya was operated until 2019 for dacha commuter service.

West section Holmsk - 77km was regauged to Russian gauge in 2020, and prorably will be operated for commuter or tourist traffic.

References

Karafuto
History of rail transport in Japan